Dilli Gang is a 2013 Indian crime film directed by Ashish Tyagi and produced by Rajeshwar Tyagi under the Radha Creations banner. The film was released on 25 October 2013.

Cast
Darshan Jariwala as Ishambar Prasad
Neena Kulkarni as Sujata
Yashpal Sharma as Inspector
 Aamir Dalvi
Asif Basra
Asif Ali

Plot
Dilli Gang is the story of an old man targeted by a dangerous gang which preys on senior citizens living alone. The film is based on true incidents of increasing murders of aged men and women staying alone in metropolitan cities.

Soundtrack

Reception
Dilli Gang received generally negative reviews from critics. The film was one of the worst movie of 2013. Faheem Ruhani of India Today stated, "Even competent actors such as Jariwala, Kulkarni, Sharma and Dalvi cannot lift this film in which the germ of idea is good one but its execution is rather poor. May be this film sounded great on paper to the above four acting talents. Sadly, none of it shows on screen."

References

External links
 

2013 films
2010s Hindi-language films
Indian crime thriller films
Films shot in Mumbai
2013 crime thriller films
Hindi-language crime films